The 1978 Montreal Expos season was the tenth season in franchise history. The team finished fourth in the National League East with a record of 76-86, 14 games behind the first-place Philadelphia Phillies.

Offseason 
 October 25, 1977: Bombo Rivera was purchased from the Expos by the Minnesota Twins.
 November 10, 1977: Darold Knowles was purchased by the Expos from the Texas Rangers.
 December 7, 1977: Joe Kerrigan, Gary Roenicke and Don Stanhouse were traded by the Expos to the Baltimore Orioles for Rudy May, Randy Miller, and Bryn Smith.
 January 10, 1978: Tony Phillips was drafted by the Expos in the 1st round (10th pick) of the secondary phase of the 1978 Major League Baseball draft. Player signed March 10, 1978.
 March 29, 1978: Will McEnaney was traded by the Expos to the Pittsburgh Pirates for Tim Jones.

Spring training
The Expos held spring training at City Island Ball Park in Daytona Beach, Florida. It was their sixth season there.

Regular season 
During the season, Ross Grimsley became the last pitcher to win at least 20 games in one season for the Expos.

Highlights 
 May 5, 1978: Pete Rose of the Cincinnati Reds became the 13th and youngest player in major league history to collect his 3,000th career hit with a single off Expos pitcher Steve Rogers.
 July 20, 1978: Shortstop Chris Speier (hitting in the number eight slot) hit for the cycle at Olympic Stadium in Montreal in front of a crowd of 14,108. Speier is the second in Expos history to hit for the cycle. Pitcher Woodie Fryman picked up the victory. Coincidentally, Fryman also got the victory when Expos shortstop Tim Foli hit for the cycle in 1976.
 July 30, 1978: The Expos set a team record (never broken while the team was in Montreal) in hits in a game when they picked up 28 as they beat the Atlanta Braves by a score of 19-0. Andre Dawson, Larry Parrish, and Gary Carter led the way with 4 hits each. A crowd of 10,834 was on hand at Atlanta's Fulton County Stadium. Pitcher Woodie Fryman picked up the victory.

First Pearson Cup 
The Pearson Cup was an annual mid-season exhibition between former Canadian rivals, the Toronto Blue Jays and the Expos. Named after former Prime Minister Lester B. Pearson, it was originally created to raise money for minor league baseball in Canada. In later years, it was incorporated into the interleague baseball schedule.

The series began in 1978, and Canadian Bill Atkinson was the winning pitcher and scored the winning run for the Expos in the first-ever Pearson Cup game at the Olympic Stadium on June 29.

Season standings

Record vs. opponents

Opening Day lineup

Notable transactions 
 May 20, 1978: Larry Landreth and Gerry Hannahs were traded by the Expos to the Los Angeles Dodgers for Mike Garman.
 June 6, 1978: 1978 Major League Baseball draft
Dave Hostetler was drafted by the Expos in the 4th round.
Bill Mooneyham was drafted by the Expos in the 6th round, but did not sign.
Jim Deshaies was drafted by the Expos in the 13th round, but did not sign.
Razor Shines was drafted by the Expos in the 18th round.
 June 9, 1978: The Expos traded a player to be named later to the Chicago Cubs for Woodie Fryman. The Expos completed the deal by sending Jerry White to the Cubs on June 23.

Roster

Player stats

Batting

Starters by position 
Note: Pos = Position; G = Games played; AB = At bats; H = Hits; Avg. = Batting average; HR = Home runs; RBI = Runs batted in

Other batters 
Note: G = Games played; AB = At bats; H = Hits; Avg. = Batting average; HR = Home runs; RBI = Runs batted in

Pitching

Starting pitchers 
Note: G = Games pitched; IP = Innings pitched; W = Wins; L = Losses; ERA = Earned run average; SO = Strikeouts

Other pitchers 
Note: G = Games pitched; IP = Innings pitched; W = Wins; L = Losses; ERA = Earned run average; SO = Strikeouts

Relief pitchers 
Note: G = Games pitched; W = Wins; L = Losses; SV = Saves; ERA = Earned run average; SO = Strikeouts

Awards and honors

All-Stars 
1978 Major League Baseball All-Star Game
 Ross Grimsley, reserve
 Steve Rogers, reserve

Farm system

Notes

References 

 1978 Montreal Expos at Baseball Reference
 1978 Montreal Expos at Baseball Almanac

Montreal Expos seasons
Montreal Expos season
1970s in Montreal
1978 in Quebec